Trent Toure Kone-Doherty (born 30 June 2006) is an Irish professional footballer currently playing as a forward for Liverpool Academy.

Club career
Born in Derry, Northern Ireland, Kone-Doherty first started playing football for local side Foyle Harps, joining at the age of six.

He joined Derry City at the age of thirteen, and went on to train with the first team squad, being involved in pre-season friendlies and earning himself a sport on the bench for a League of Ireland Premier Division game against St Patrick's Athletic at the age of fifteen. Despite not making his debut for Derry City, he began to attract attention from British clubs Celtic and Liverpool, having gone on trial with the former in 2020.

In July 2022, he signed for Liverpool in a deal worth a reported £150,000. His career in Merseyside got off to a blistering start, scoring nine goals in his first 10 appearances for Liverpool's youth teams.

International career
Kone-Doherty has represented the Republic of Ireland at under-16 and under-17 level. In 2022, he was named "best player" at the under-16 Miljan Miljanic Tournament in Serbia.

References

2006 births
Living people
Sportspeople from Derry (city)
Association footballers from Northern Ireland
Republic of Ireland association footballers
Republic of Ireland youth international footballers
Association football forwards
Derry City F.C. players
Liverpool F.C. players